Montégut-Arros is a commune in the Gers département in southwestern France.

Geography

Population
Its inhabitants are known as Montégutois (male) or Montégutoise (female).

See also
Communes of the Gers department

References

Communes of Gers